"Wild as Her" is a song recorded by Canadian country music artist Tyler Joe Miller. It was written by fellow country artist Morgan Wallen with Brett Tyler and Kelly Archer, and produced by Danick Dupelle.

Background
Miller stated that the song "isn’t your typical love song, it’s the hopeful chase of a guy trying to get, and keep, this girl around who’s an untameable rolling stone". Online outlet Music-News.com hosted an exclusive premiere of the song on February 11, 2022.

Critical reception
Maxwell Barkhuizen of Music Crowns stated that "Wild as Her" "shows exactly why so many have been talking about [Miller]", referring to the track as "lively", saying he "[plays] with the traditional side of the country sound, but [adds] his own distinctive flair throughout". Chad Carlson of Today's Country Magazine said that the song "subtly introduces the internal conflict of finding the balance between finding a way to keep someone in your life while also struggling to realize whether or not that person is right for you," adding that Miller would garner "more fans, more streams, and more critical acclaim" with its release.

Commercial performance
"Wild as Her" reached a peak of number eight on the Billboard Canada Country chart for the week of June 11, 2022, marking Miller's fifth-consecutive top ten hit to begin his career. It also peaked at number 94 on the all-genre Canadian Hot 100 for the same week. The song has been certified Gold by Music Canada.

Accolades

Track listings
Digital download – single
 "Wild as Her" – 3:02

Digital download – single
 "Wild as Her" (Stripped) – 3:02

Music video
The official music video for "Wild as Her" premiered on April 27, 2022. It was directed by David J. Redman and was shot in Nashville, Tennessee. Miller stated that the video "portrays what it’s like to be chasing after the girl that all the guys want to lock down," saying that in the end "it’s the guy who compliments her wild side that she’ll end up with".

Charts

Certifications

Other versions
"Wild as Her" was first recorded commercially by Colby Keeling, and was released on January 10, 2020.

Subsequent to Tyler Joe Miller's version, American country music singer Corey Kent covered the song. In June 2022, it charted in the top 20 of the Hot Country Songs chart and in March 2023, reached number 58 on the Billboard Hot 100 chart. His version was promoted by RCA Records Nashville to country radio in August 2022.

References

2022 songs
2022 singles
Tyler Joe Miller songs
Corey Kent songs
Songs written by Morgan Wallen
Songs written by Kelly Archer
Song recordings produced by Danick Dupelle
RCA Records Nashville singles